Thomas Stopford   was Bishop of Cork and Ross from  1794 and died in post on  24 January 1805.

He was the son of the first Earl of Courtown. He was Rector of Kiltinel and served as Dean of Killaloe from 1781 to 1787 before being appointed Dean of Ferns in 1787. In 1790 he was made second chaplain to John Fane, 10th Earl of Westmorland.

In 1794 he was elevated to the episcopacy as Bishop of Cork and Ross.

Notes

1805 deaths
Deans of Killaloe
Deans of Ferns
Bishops of Cork and Ross (Church of Ireland)
18th-century Anglican bishops in Ireland
19th-century Anglican bishops in Ireland
Younger sons of earls
Thomas
Year of birth missing